Robert Gichimu Githinji is a Kenyan lawyer and politician who has served in the National Assembly of Kenya since 2017, representing the Gichugu Constituency.

Career 
Githinji attended the University of Nairobi from 1995 until 1999, graduating with a Bachelor of Law degree. In 2000, he received a Diploma in Law from the Kenya School of Law. In 2001, Githinji was admitted to the Kenyan Bar, and he began his law practice as an advocate of the High Court of Kenya.

In the 2013 Kenyan general election, Githinji ran for the National Assembly of Kenya, contesting the Gichugu Constituency in Kirinyaga County as a member of the Grand National Union of Kenya. However, Githinji was defeated by Ejidius Njogu Barua of The National Alliance, receiving 20,192 votes compared to Barua's 24,839.

In the 2017 Kenyan general election, Githinji joined the newly-formed Jubilee Party and ran again for the same constituency. Though he faced two opponents, Githinji was easily elected, receiving 68,521 votes out of a total of 74,255 votes cast. During this term, Githinji served on the Committee on Trade, Industry and Cooperatives and the Committee on Selection.

Githinji successfully ran for re-election in the 2022 Kenyan general election as a member of the United Democratic Alliance, defeating nine opponents and receiving 33,889 votes.

References 

Year of birth missing (living people)
Place of birth missing (living people)
Date of birth missing (living people)
Members of the National Assembly (Kenya)
21st-century Kenyan politicians
Jubilee Party politicians
University of Nairobi alumni
Kenya School of Law alumni
United Democratic Alliance (Kenya) politicians
Grand National Union of Kenya politicians
Living people
Members of the 12th Parliament of Kenya
Members of the 13th Parliament of Kenya